Buck Nelson (April 9, 1895 – 1982) was an American farmer who claimed to have had an encounter with an unidentified flying object and its human crew in 1954 while living in Missouri. Buck Nelson believed the friendly occupants of the spacecraft to be humans from the planet Venus. His story is contained in a 1956 booklet he authored, My Trip to Mars, the Moon, and Venus.

Claim 

His account states that he saw three flying saucers over his farmhouse; he took photographs and attempted to signal with a flash-light. A beam of light "much brighter and hotter than the
sun" was shined at him. Consequently, he testified that his chronic lumbago disappeared and his eyesight dramatically improved. He goes on to claim that, after dusk fell, three "friendly human spacemen" accompanied by a large dog, visited him and spent some time talking with him.

The message 

Nelson further stated that two of the people from Venus had adopted the names Bucky and Bob, and their main message concerned the "Twelve Laws of God", similar to the biblical Ten Commandments. He claimed to have been taken on trips to the Moon, Mars and Venus. He described how space people told him that on earth, past civilizations existed and destroyed themselves "They had learned of a power even greater than our Atomic power". He said the space people warned him that the inappropriate use of nuclear energy was threatening the earth again; "We are here to see which way this world will use Atomic power; for peace or war. We have stood by and seen other planets, one after another, destroy itself. Is this world next? We wonder and watch and wait. Again I say; give up your Atomic weapons and may Peace be on this Earth".

Similarly to Moses, Nelson was also given Commandments. These are a set of biblical principles relating to ethics and worship.

The Book machine 

Nelson described the "book machine" thus "on Venus, Bucky managed to show me what I called a "Book Machine". When a book was put into it, it would read the pages, play any music or show any picture it contained. It was about the size of a television set".

Minor celebrity 

In 1956, Nelson published a booklet, My Trip to Mars, the Moon, and Venus, and became something of a celebrity in the Ozarks. He held a successful annual Spacecraft Convention near his farm for about a decade, where he sold his pamphlet, and pay envelopes containing a small amounts of black hair, which he claimed had fallen off the large dog called "Bo".

Nelson died in 1982. An unconfirmed account states he spent his declining years with relatives in California. His story achieved a notable degree of popularity, but not that of other contactees such as George Adamski or Daniel Fry.

References

External links 
 Buck Nelson My Trip to Mars the Moon and Venus
 Overview of 1950s Contactees
 LOOK magazine's coverage of the UFO conventions of Buck Nelson and of George Van Tassel
 Long John Nebel's radio interviews with 1950s contactees.
 Buck Nelson "My Trip To Mars the Moon and Planet A Revised Edition"

1894 births
1982 deaths
American UFO writers
Contactees
Farmers from Missouri
People from Howell County, Missouri